Vital Kamerhe (born 4 March 1959) is a Congolese politician who is the chief of staff of President Félix Tshisekedi and leader of the Union for the Congolese Nation (UNC) opposition party. Previously he was the President of the National Assembly of the Democratic Republic of the Congo from 2006 to 2009. After resigning from that office, he went into the opposition and founded the UNC. Kamerhe was a candidate in the 2011 presidential election. In 2018 Kamerhe supported Félix Tshisekedi for president and was made his chief of staff after the election.

Kamerhe was charged with corruption in April 2020, and was incarcerated in the Makala Prison. Kamerhe was found guilty on 20 June 2020 and sentenced to 20 years of forced labour due to embezzling more than USD 48 million of public funds. It was the first time in the Democratic Republic of the Congo that a high-level politician was convicted of corruption. Despite the fact that he was convicted, he still is the chief of staff of President Tshisekedi.

Biography

Early life and education
Born in Bukavu, Sud-Kivu, on March 4, 1959, Vital Kamerhe Lwa Kanyiginyi Nkingi  is the son of Constantin Kamerhe Kanyginyi and Alphonsine Mwa Nkingi. Originally from the Shi community of the Walungu territory, he is married and father of 9 children.

He began his primary school in Bukavu and then in Goma. He then continued in the Kasai-Oriental, in Gandajika, where he finishes his primary school.
School years 1975-1976 and 1976–1977, he attended the Institut Sadisana (former College St. Francois-Xavier) in Kikwit Sacré-Coeur, Bandundu province. He then moved to Kananga (Kasai-Occidental Province) and finally, after one year, to Mbuji-Mayi where he obtained his State degree in 1980 (Institut Mulemba). This experience led him to learn all four national languages of Congo namely Kikongo, Lingala, Kiswahili and Tshiluba. He also speaks fluent French.

From there he completed his studies at the University of Kinshasa, where he received his degree in Economics in 1987 with distinction. There he stayed as teaching assistant.

Political career

Under Mobutu
Kamerhe started his political career in 1984 with the UDPS (Union pour la Démocratie et le Progrès Social). During the democratic transition under Mobutu, he was a member of the Rassemblement des forces Sociales et Federalistes (RSF) of Vincent de Paul Lunda Bululu and was also president of the Jeunesse de l'Union Sacrée de l'opposition Radicale et Alliés (JUSORAL), an opposition youth sport.
Between 1993 and 1995 he worked in several public functions:
 1993 : Director of the Cabinet of the Ministry of the Environment, Tourism and Directeur de Cabinet au Ministère de l’Environnement, Tourisme et Conservation de la Nature
 1994 : Coordinator of the Prime Minister's Cabinet
 1994-1995: Director of the Cabinet for the Minister of Higher Education and University, Mushobekwa Kalimba wa Katana, member of Lunda Bululu's RSF
There is some controversy over whether he was a member of a Mobutist youth league (Frojemo), led by General Etienne Nzimbi Ngbale Kongo wa Basa, a fact his opponent often use to discredit him.

Under Kabila
Under Laurent Kabila, Kamerhe became the deputy chief of staff of Etienne-Richard Mbaya, the minister of reconstruction, then:
 From 1997 to 1998 : Director of the Service National (a quasi-military service set up by Laurent Kabila)
 In 1998 : Finance Counselor at the Ministère de la Défense Nationale et Anciens Combattants, with the general Denis Kalume

and finally deputy commissioner in charge of MONUC affairs.

Role in the peace process of the Great Lakes region
A founding member of the PPRD party in 2002, Vital Kamerhe was one of the leading figures in the peace process in the Democratic Republic of Congo, he was even nicknamed "le Pacificateur", the "Peacemaker". As Commissioner General of the Government responsible for monitoring the peace process in the Great Lakes region he was one of the principal negotiators of the 2002 peace deal.
In 2003, he was appointed Minister of Press and Information in the transitional government.

Role in the 2006 election campaign
In July 2004, he took on the leadership of the PPRD and prepared Joseph Kabila's election campaign, which he received a lot of credit for. He was elected as parliamentarian in Bukavu with one of the highest scores in the country and on December 29, 2006, he was elected president of the National Assembly.

Events since 2009
In 2009, as President of the National Assembly, he questioned Kabila and his own party over the Umoja Wetu operations that allowed several thousand Rwandan troops to deploy into the Congo without informing the parliament. On January 21, 2009, he released a statement to Radio Okapi expressing his disappointment for the joint military operations between the Congolese and Rwandan army in the Kivu, conducted without informing the National Assembly and the Senate and thus violating the article 213 of the constitution.

On March 25, 2009, he delivered a speech resigning as President of the National Assembly. On December 14, 2010, Kamerhe officially quit the PPRD, announcing his candidacy for the 2011 presidential election and the creation of his new party, the UNC, which had its official inauguration in February 2011. He gained 7.74% of the country's vote in the 2011 presidential election under the UNC name.

In the 2018 presidential election Kamerhe made an alliance to support Félix Tshisekedi's candidacy, leader of the Union for Democracy and Social Progress. In exchange he became Tshisekedi's  chief of staff in January 2019. 

On 8 April 2020, Kamerhe was arrested and detained in Makala prison on charges of corruption and embezzlement of $48 million dollars. On 20 June 2020, Kamerhe, was sentenced to twenty years of forced labor and ten years of ineligibility and inability to access public office for embezzlement, aggravated corruption and money laundering. His co-defendant, the Lebanese businessman Samih Jammal, received the same sentences and an expulsion order after the sentences are finished. A third defendant, Jeannot Muhima, was sentenced to two years of forced labor. The court also ordered the confiscation of the accounts and properties of family members of Kamerhe, as confiscation applies to all illicitly obtained things regardless of subsequent owner.

However, Kamerhe was provisionally released alredy in December 2021.

On 23 June 2022, Kamerhe was acquitted. He was later pictured enjoying his newfound freedom surrounded by family – his wife, his children, his mother – as well as friends and collaborators, at one of his residences in the posh neighbourhood La Gombe.

Family
He is the brother-in-law of Aimé Boji.

References

1959 births
Living people
People from Bukavu
Candidates for President of the Democratic Republic of the Congo
Presidents of the National Assembly (Democratic Republic of the Congo)
Union for the Congolese Nation politicians
Democratic Republic of the Congo politicians convicted of crimes